The 2016–17 season saw Barnsley's return to the Championship after two seasons in League One, following their relegation in the 2013–14 season. Along with the Championship, the club also competed in the FA Cup and League Cup. The season covered the period from 1 July 2016 to 30 June 2017.

Squad

Statistics

|-
|colspan="14"|Player(s) out on loan:

|-
|colspan="14"|Player(s) who left the club:

|}

Goals record

Disciplinary Record

Transfers

In

Out

Loans In

Loans out

Competitions

Pre-season friendlies

EFL Championship

League table

Results summary

Results by matchday

Matches

FA Cup

EFL Cup

Summary

References

Barnsley F.C. seasons
Barnsley